The 2020 New Hampshire House of Representatives elections took place as part of the biennial United States elections. New Hampshire voters elected all 400 state representatives from 204 districts. State representatives serve two-year terms in the New Hampshire House of Representatives. A primary election on September 8, 2020 determined which candidates appeared on the November 3 general election ballot. All the members elected will serve in the 167th New Hampshire General Court.

Following the 2018 election, Democrats had control of the New Hampshire House of Representatives with 231 seats to Republicans' 159 seats. Following the 2020 election, the Republicans flipped control of the chamber alongside the New Hampshire Senate.

Summary of results
Bold indicates a partisan flip of a seat.
Italics indicates a change in representative but not party.

Sources

Retiring incumbents
71 incumbent Representatives (35 Democrats and 36 Republicans) did not seek reelection in 2020:

Belknap 1: Harry Viens (R)
Belknap 3: Richard Beaudoin (R)
Belknap 3: Peter Spanos (R)
Belknap 3: Frank Tilton (R)
Belknap 4: Dennis Fields (R)
Belknap 5: George Feeney (R)
Carroll 2: Harrison Kanzler (D)
Carroll 5: Ed Comeau (R)
Carroll 6: Edith DesMarais (D)
Carroll 7: Ed Butler (D)
Cheshire 6: David Meader (D)
Cheshire 10: Sandy Swinburne (D)
Cheshire 11: John O'Day (R)
Cheshire 14: Craig Thompson (D) [Ran for Executive Council (lost primary)]
Coös 1: John Fothergill (R)
Coös 1: Michael Furbush (R)
Coös 2: Wayne Moynihan (D)
Coös 3: Yvonne Thomas (D)
Grafton 1: Erin Hennessey (R) [Ran for State Senate (won)]
Grafton 3: Susan Ford (D) [Ran for State Senate (lost)]
Grafton 12: Polly Campion (D)
Grafton 12: Mary Jane Mulligan (D)
Hillsborough 2: J.P. Marzullo (R)
Hillsborough 6: Cole Riel (D)
Hillsborough 7: Linda Camarota (D)
Hillsborough 13: Kathy Desjardin (D)
Hillsborough 19: Bob Backus (D)
Hillsborough 21: Dick Barry (D)
Hillsborough 21: Bob L'Heureux (R)
Hillsborough 22: Reed Panasiti (R)
Hillsborough 22: Julie Radhakrishnan (D)
Hillsborough 23: Paul Dargie (D)
Hillsborough 23: Charlie Burns (R)
Hillsborough 23: Joelle Martin (D)
Hillsborough 25: Tim Merlino (R)
Hillsborough 26: Jack Flanagan (R)
Hillsborough 26: Brett Hall (R)
Hillsborough 27: Michelle St. John (D)
Hillsborough 34: Greg Indruk (D)
Hillsborough 37: James Whittemore (R)
Hillsborough 38: Chris Balch (D)
Hillsborough 44: Mark Proulx (R)
Merrimack 2: Werner D. Horn (R)
Merrimack 6: Beth Rodd (D)
Merrimack 8: Robert Forsythe (R)
Merrimack 9: Howard Moffett (D)
Merrimack 9: George Saunderson (D)
Merrimack 15: Ryan Buchanan (D)
Merrimack 22: Alan Turcotte (D)
Merrimack 24: Frank Kotowski (R)
Merrimack 25: David Karrick (D)
Rockingham 1: David Coursin (D)
Rockingham 3: Michael Costable (R)
Rockingham 3: Kathleen Hoelzel (R)
Rockingham 4: Becky Owens (R)
Rockingham 6: Brian Chirichiello (R)
Rockingham 6: John O'Connor (R)
Rockingham 6: James C. Webb (R)
Rockingham 7: Joel Desilets (R)
Rockingham 8: Arthur Barnes (R)
Rockingham 8: Ed DeClercq (R)
Rockingham 16: Dan Davis (R)
Rockingham 18: Skip Berrien (D)
Rockingham 21: Patricia Bushway (D)
Rockingham 31: Tamara Le (D)
Rockingham 36: Patricia Lovejoy (D) [Ran for Executive Council (lost primary)]
Sullivan 2: Gates Lucas (R)
Strafford 9: Steven Beaudoin (R)
Strafford 15: Linn Opderbecke (D)
Strafford 24: Mona Perreault (R)
Sullivan 8: Tom Laware (R)

Defeated incumbents

In the primary
10 incumbent representatives (6 Republicans and 4 Democrats) sought reelection but were defeated in the September 8 primary.
Belknap 2: Deanna Jurius (R)
Belknap 6: John Plumer (R)
Cheshire 13: Henry Parkhurst (D)
Cheshire 16: William Pearson (D)
Hillsborough 31: Fred Davis Jr. (D)
Hillsborough 33: Ken N. Gidge (D)
Rockingham 7: Walter Kolodziej (R)
Rockingham 20: William Fowler (R)
Rockingham 37: Jason Janvrin (R)
Strafford 1: Abigail Rooney (R)

In the general election
33 incumbent representatives (32 Democrats and one Republican) sought reelection but were defeated in the November 3 general election.

Belknap 3: David Huot (D)
Belknap 9: Charlie St. Clair (D)
Carroll 3: Susan Ticehurst (D)
Cheshire 13: Bruce Tatro (D)
Coös 3: Henry Noel (D)
Grafton 5: Jerry Stringham (D)
Grafton 6: Kevin Maes (D)
Grafton 7: Richard Osborne (D)
Grafton 11: Timothy Josephson (D)
Grafton 14: Elaine French (D)
Hillsborough 4: Jennifer Bernet (D)
Hillsborough 4: Kermit Williams (D)
Hillsborough 5: David Woodbury (D)
Hillsborough 5: Donna Mombourquette (D)
Hillsborough 21: Wendy Thomas (D)
Hillsborough 21: Nancy Murphy (D)
Hillsborough 21: Kathryn Stack (D)
Hillsborough 28: William Bordy (D)
Hillsborough 38: James Bosman (D)
Merrimack 1: Ken Wells (D)
Merrimack 3: Joyce Fulweiler (D)
Merrimack 7: Clyde Carson (D)
Merrimack 8: Robert Forsythe (R)
Merrimack 20: David Doherty (D)
Merrimack 24: Kathleen Martins (D)
Rockingham 5: Anne Warner (D)
Rockingham 6: Mary Eisner (D)
Rockingham 9: Mark Vallone (D)
Rockingham 11: Liz McConnell (D)
Strafford 4: Matthew Towne (D)
Strafford 22: Peg Higgins (D)
Strafford 23: Sandra Keans (D)

Predictions

Detailed results

Notes

See also
 2020 New Hampshire elections
2020 United States elections
2020 United States Senate election in New Hampshire
2020 United States House of Representatives elections in New Hampshire
New Hampshire gubernatorial election, 2020

References

External links
 
 
  (State affiliate of the U.S. League of Women Voters)
 

House
New Hampshire House
New Hampshire House of Representatives elections